The fiery-tailed awlbill (Avocettula recurvirostris) is a species of hummingbird in the subfamily Polytminae, the mangoes. It is found in Brazil, Ecuador, French Guiana, Guyana, Suriname, and Venezuela.

Taxonomy and systematics

The fiery-tailed awlbill is the only member of genus Avocettula and has no subspecies. The genus had earlier been merged into Anthracothorax.

Description

Its unique bill is short with a dramatically upturned tip. The adult male has green upperparts. Its throat is shiny emerald green and the belly shiny emerald green with a black center. The top of the tail is violet but for all-green central feathers. The adult female also has green upperparts. Its underparts are white with a black stripe down the middle. Its tail is bluish black and the outer feathers have white tips. Juveniles are similar to the adult female but the underside of the tail is coppery red.

Distribution and habitat

The fiery-tailed awlbill is found in Amazonia, from southeastern Venezuela east through the Guianas into northern Brazil and south into Brazil as far west as Acre and as far east as Maranhão and Tocantins. There is also a disjunct population along the Napo River in eastern Ecuador. The species has been recorded as a vagrant in Colombia.

The fiery-tailed awlbill primarily inhabits open savanna-like areas in primary forest where it favors vegetation near granite outcrops. It can also be found at the edges of low vegetation near rivers, semi-deciduous forest, and cerrado.

Behavior

Movement

The fiery-tailed awlbill is believed to be sedentary.

Feeding

The fiery-tailed awlbill is a "trap-line" feeder, visiting a circuit of flowering plants to collect nectar. It favors Clusia and Dioclea shrubs, and feeds both by inserting its bill into flowers and by piercing the base of flowers to "rob" nectar.
It also catches arthropods on the wing and by gleaning from the underside of leaves.

Breeding

The fiery-tailed awlbill's breeding season varies across its range. It is known to span from September to December in Suriname and there are records from July in northern Brazil and French Guiana. The female alone incubates the clutch of two eggs.

Vocalization

The fiery-tailed awlbill's song has not been recorded. Its call is "a series of 'tsik' notes" and is given in flight or while hovering.

Status

The IUCN originally assessed the fiery-tailed awlbill as Near Threatened but since 2004 has rated it as being of Least Concern. Its population size is unknown and is believed to be decreasing. It is widespread but "generally considered rare" and has restricted habitat requirements. It does occur in several protected areas.

References

fiery-tailed awlbill
Hummingbird species of South America
Birds of the Amazon Basin
Birds of the Ecuadorian Amazon
Birds of the Guianas
Birds of Brazil
fiery-tailed awlbill
Taxonomy articles created by Polbot